Alexander Carol Schmidt (1879–1954) was a Bessarabian politician, mayor of Chișinău between 1917 and 1918. A Bessarabian German, he was a son of Carol Schmidt.

Notes

External links
 Primari ai orașului Chișinău - Departamentul „Memoria Chișinăului” al Bibliotecii Municipale „B.P. Hașdeu”
  Incursion dans l’histoire de Chisinau, la capitale moldave

1879 births
1954 deaths
Bessarabia-German people
People from the Russian Empire of Polish descent
Moldovan people of Polish descent
Mayors of Chișinău